Timeless was a concert tour by entertainer Barbra Streisand. Following her hotly anticipated Millennium Concert 1999/2000 (which is cited as being part of this tour) Barbra decided to take this concert on the road for an 8-day tour of Australia, Los Angeles & New York. The tour grossed a record-breaking $70 million and drew audiences of 200,000 for only 10 dates.

History 

The tour was directed by Streisand and Kenny Ortega and was originally set to be solely a Millennium concert with 2 concerts seeing in the 21st century. The dates were released in April and all tickets sold out within a few hours of going on sale. Following the success of the millennium concert, Barbra decided to take the tour on the road and visited Australia for the first time and included Melbourne and Sydney before heading back to America for 4 other concerts in Los Angeles and New York City. Although only 10 shows were performed, they were spread over 9 months.

Broadcasts and recordings 
The week before the final concerts Columbia Records released a 2-disc CD of the millennium concert entitled Timeless: Live in Concert which entered the US Billboard charts at number 21 and was certified Platinum by the RIAA. This CD includes a credit listing Sydney Philharmonia Choirs who recorded backing tracks in March 2000 (the weekend after their live performances with Barbra in Sydney) that were included in this 'live' album. 
February 2001 saw the release of Timeless the DVD which debuted at Number 1 on the Billboard Top Music Video Sales chart and has been certified Platinum by the RIAA.

Set list 

"You'll Never Know" 
"Something's Coming" 
"The Way We Were" 
"Cry Me a River" 
"Lover, Come Back To Me" 
"A Sleepin' Bee" 
"Miss Marmelstein" 
"I'm the Greatest Star" / "Second Hand Rose" / "Don't Rain on My Parade" 
"Something Wonderful" / "Being Alive" 
"As Time Goes By" / "Speak Low" 
"Alfie"
"Evergreen" 
"Papa, Can You Hear Me? / "You'll Never Know" 
"A Piece of Sky" 
Intermission
"Putting It Together"
"On A Clear Day (You Can See Forever)" 
"Send In the Clowns" 
"Happy Days Are Here Again" 
"Get Happy
"Guilty" (with Barry Gibb) 
"I Finally Found Someone" (with Bryan Adams) 
"Tell Him" (with Celine Dion) 
"You Don't Bring Me Flowers" (with Neil Diamond)"
"Sing" (with Jason Gould) 
"I've Got a Crush on You" 
"The Clicker Blues" 
"Simple Pleasures"
"The Main Event" / "Fight" 
"I've Dreamed of You" 
"At the Same Time" 
"People" 
"Happy Days Are Here Again"
"Don't Like Goodbyes"
"I Believe" / "Somewhere" 

Set list per official DVD track listing.

Shows

Personnel
NOTE: Some performers do not appear in person.
Bryan Adams – vocals
Robert L. Adcock – celli
Louis Armstrong – trumpet
Steve Becknell – french horn
Douglas Besterman – arranger
Chris Bishop – engineer
Peggie Blu – backing vocals
Chris Boardman – arranger
Ralph Burns – arranger, adaptation
Jorge Calandrelli – arranger
Darius Campo – violin
Chris Carlton – engineer
Jon Clarke – woodwind
John Clayton – arranger
Don Costa – arranger
Joe Covello – photography
Debbie Datz-Pyle – contractor
Mario de Leon – violin
Neil Diamond – vocals
Celine Dion – vocals
Chuck Domanico – bass
Bruce Dukov – violin
Sam Emerson – photography
Martin Erlichman – executive producer
Bob Esty – arranger, conductor
David Ewart – violin
Peter Fletcher – product manager
David Foster – arranger
Bruce Fowler – trombone
Ian Freebairn-Smith – arranger
Lauren Frost – vocals
Matt Funes – viola
Judy Garland – vocals
Barry Gibb – vocals
Phil Gitomer – technical manager
Savion Glover – actor
Mark Graham – librarian
Gary Grant – trumpet
Dan Greco – percussion
Henry Grossman – photography
Marvin Hamlisch – arranger, director
Jack Hayes – arranger
Gwen Heller – violin
Randee Heller – vocals
Ryan Hewitt – assistant engineer
Jerry Hey – trumpet
Dan Higgins – woodwind
Jim Hoffman – librarian
Rupert Holmes – arranger
Carrie Holzman-Little – viola
Paul Jabara – arranger
Bruce Jackson – sound design
Ron Jannelli – woodwind
Alan Kaplan – trombone
Eddie Karam – arranger
Suzie Katayama – celli
Steve Khan – narrator
Jay Landers – executive producer
Alec Ledd – vocals
Annie Leibovitz – photography
Brian Leonard – violin
Warren Leuning – trumpet
Gayle Levant – harp
Dane Little – celli
Charles Loper – trombone
Jeremy Lubbock – arranger
Stephen Marcussen – mastering
Nick Marshall – mixing
Peter Matz – arranger, producer
Kevin Mazur – photography
Ed Meares – bass
Don Mischer – producer
Suzette Moriarty – French horn
Horia Moroaica – violin
Ralph Morrison – concert master
Peter Morse – lighting design, lighting director
Dan Newfeld – viola
Robin Olson – violin
Kenny Ortega – writer, assistant director
Marty Paich – arranger
Dean Parks – guitar
Joel Peskin – woodwind
Barbara Porter – violin
Sid Ramin – arranger
Tom Ranier – keyboards
Gabrielle Raumberger – art direction, design
Dave Reitzas – mixing
Nelson Riddle – arranger
Bruce Roberts – arranger
Gil Romero – violin
William James Ross – arranger
Randee Saint Nicholas – photography
Mark Sazer – violin
Walter Scharf – arranger
Harry Shirinian – viola
John Simpson – engineer
Frank Sinatra – vocals
Kim Skalecki – assistant
Lew Soloff – trumpet
Michael Starobin – arranger
Barbra Streisand – director, vocals, producer, writer
Neil Stubenhaus – electric bass
Shari Sutcliffe – project coordinator
Karen Swenson – consultant, photo research
Phil Teele – trombone
Alberto Tolot – photography
Bob Tricarico – woodwind
Charles Valentino – actor
Fred Vogler – engineer
Jürgen Vollmer – photography
Randy Waldman – arranger, keyboards
Brad Warnaar – French horn
Phil Yao – French horn
Ken Yerke – violin
Firooz Zahedi – photography, cover photo
Patty Zimmitti – contractor
Robert Zimmitti – percussion
Torrie Zito – arranger
Simon Page - Artist Security Director 
David Lindsay - Artist Security

References

Barbra Streisand concert tours
1999 concert tours
2000 concert tours